Lynette Gai Cook is an Australian botanist and entomologist. She earned a PhD from the ANU in 2001 with a thesis entitled The biology, evolution and systematics of the Gall-inducing scale insect Apiomorpha Rübsaamen (Hemiptera: Sternorrhyncha: Coccoidea)

She is associate professor in the School of Biological Sciences at Queensland University, where she has worked since 2006. Her major research focus is to "understand the origins, diversification and distributions of organisms, especially plants and insects in Australia."

She has made considerable contributions in the  biogeography of plants and insects,  in plant/animal co-evolution, and to the evolutionary history of other biota.

Names published
Daviesia devito Crisp & L.G.Cook
Daviesia schwarzenegger Crisp & L.G.Cook

References 

Living people
21st-century Australian botanists
Australian entomologists
Australian National University alumni
Academic staff of the University of Queensland
Year of birth missing (living people)